Jesenija Volžankina (born 26 November 1983) is a retired Latvian heptathlete.

She finished thirteenth in the heptathlon at the 2006 European Championships. She also competed in the long jump at the 2005 European Indoor Championships and the 2006 European Championships without reaching the final.

Her personal best heptathlon score was 5996 points, achieved in July 2006 in Monzón. Her personal best long jump was 6.54 metres, achieved in August 2006 in Tallinn.

References 

1983 births
Living people
Latvian heptathletes
Latvian female long jumpers
21st-century Latvian women